Francesco Russo (born 23 December 1981) is an Italian footballer who currently plays for USD CasateseRogoredo as a goalkeeper.

Biography
Russo left for Lecco from Torino in 2001 in co-ownership deal, along with Marco Andreotti. In 2002, he left for Alzano and in 2003 for Solbiatese. In January 2004 he was signed by Sampdoria and immediately left for Palazzolo.

In 2004, he was transferred to Swiss Challenge League side Chiasso. In 2007 Russo returned to Italy for Lanciano.

In March 2019, Russo returned to Italy and joined FC Parabiago. In the summer 2019, he moved to USD CasateseRogoredo.

References

External links
Profile at aic.football.it 

Living people
1981 births
Italian footballers
Italian expatriate footballers
Swiss Super League players
Swiss Challenge League players
Serie C players
S.S. Virtus Lanciano 1924 players
A.S. Melfi players
A.S.D. SolbiaSommese Calcio players
Virtus Bergamo Alzano Seriate 1909 players
Calcio Lecco 1912 players
S.S.D. Pro Sesto players
U.S. Avellino 1912 players
FC Chiasso players
FC Aarau players
FC Lugano players
Association football goalkeepers
Sportspeople from the Province of Varese
Italian expatriate sportspeople in Switzerland
Expatriate footballers in Switzerland
Footballers from Lombardy